Chelidonium, commonly known as celandines, is a small genus of flowering plants in the poppy family, This genus is native to northern Africa and Eurasia, where they are widespread, ranging from western Europe to east Asia.

This genus consists of herbaceous perennials. Leaves are alternate and deeply lobed. They produce yellow flowers.

Species
Chelidonium is a small genus, consisting of two to three species, depending on the taxonomic treatment. These are:

References

External links

Papaveraceae genera
Papaveroideae